Glenwood is an unincorporated community and census-designated place (CDP) in Klickitat County, Washington, United States. The community is on land whose jurisdiction is disputed between the Yakama Nation and Klickitat County.

The community was named for the glen and woods near the original town site.

Glenwood was the site of a fatal black bear attack of four year old Victoria Valdez near her home in 1974.

The population of Glenwood in 2020 was 179.

Climate
Glenwood has a warm-summer Mediterranean climate (Csb) according to the Köppen climate classification system.

Land dispute

Ownership of this area has been in dispute dating back to the Treaty of 1855. An 1890 survey of the Yakama Reservation, accepted by the General Land Office, did not include the area known as "Tract-D". The original treaty map, which included the Tract-D area, was found in 1930 after being misplaced for decades. In the meantime  of the Glenwood Valley had passed into private ownership. Another  were part of the Gifford Pinchot National Forest administered by the United States Department of Agriculture. After more than 100 years of dispute, in 1972 President Richard Nixon by Executive Order 11670 authorized the return of the 21,000 acre portion of Mt. Adams, including the summit, to the Yakama Nation. The area returned to the Yakama Nation did not include the 98,000 acres of Tract D in the Glenwood Valley. The Yakama Nation accepted $2.1 million in 1970 for their claims.

In 2022, Klickitat County’s claim that Glenwood is not part of the Yakama reservation was rejected by the United States Supreme Court.

References
http://www.glenwoodwashingtonweather.info/
http://www.goldendalesentinel.com/story/2015/04/29/news/glenwood-fights-to-avoid-being-absorbed-into-indian-lands/5805.html
http://www.wsdot.wa.gov/mapsdata/geodatacatalog/Maps/noscale/DOT_Cartog/TribalLands.htm

Unincorporated communities in Klickitat County, Washington
Unincorporated communities in Washington (state)
Census-designated places in Klickitat County, Washington
Census-designated places in Washington (state)